White Ash is an unincorporated community and Coal town in Lee County, Kentucky, United States.

References

Unincorporated communities in Lee County, Kentucky
Unincorporated communities in Kentucky
Coal towns in Kentucky